Éric Chaulvet (born August 5, 1974 in Amiens, France) is a French basketball player who played 13 games for French Pro A league club Vichy during the 2002-2003 season.

References

External links
 profil www.lnb.fr  sports reference retrieved 2 December 2011

1974 births
Living people
French men's basketball players
Sportspeople from Amiens